Gabriel Allen White (born November 20, 1971) is a former American professional baseball player who pitched in Major League Baseball (MLB) from  to . White gave up Hall of Famer Tony Gwynn's final hit of his career, on October 6, 2001, while pitching for the Colorado Rockies.

External links

1971 births
Living people
American expatriate baseball players in Canada
Baseball players from Florida
Cincinnati Reds players
Colorado Rockies players
Gulf Coast Expos players
Gulf Coast Yankees players
Harrisburg Senators players
Indianapolis Indians players
Louisville Bats players
Major League Baseball pitchers
Memphis Redbirds players
Montreal Expos players
New York Yankees players
Ottawa Lynx players
People from Sebring, Florida
Rockford Expos players
St. Louis Cardinals players
Sumter Flyers players
Tampa Yankees players
Trenton Thunder players
West Palm Beach Expos players